Neeressa is a genus of moths in the subfamily Arctiinae.

Species
 Neeressa palawanensis Wileman & West, 1928
 Neeressa sagada Semper, 1898
 Neeressa whiteheadi Rothschild, 1910

References

Natural History Museum Lepidoptera generic names catalog

Arctiinae